The men's track time trial in Cycling at the 1996 Summer Olympics was a time trial race in which each of the twenty cyclists attempted to set the fastest time for four laps (1 kilometre) of the track. The race was held on Wednesday, July 24, 1996 at the Stone Mountain Velodrome. There were 20 competitors from 20 nations, with each nation limited to one cyclist. The event was won by Florian Rousseau of France, the nation's first victory in the men's track trial since 1968 and fourth overall (most of any nation, leading multiple others by two). Erin Hartwell of the United States took silver, becoming the fourth man to win multiple medals in the event. Japan won its first track time trial medal with Takanobu Jumonji's bronze.

Background

This was the 17th appearance of the event, which had previously been held in 1896 and every Games since 1928. It would be held every Games until being dropped from the programme after 2004. The returning cyclists from 1992 were silver medalist Shane Kelly of Australia, bronze medalist Erin Hartwell of the United States, eighth-place finisher Gene Samuel of Trinidad and Tobago, ninth-place finisher Dirk Jan van Hameren of the Netherlands, twelfth-place finisher Aleksandr Kirichenko of the Unified Team (also the 1988 gold medalist for the Soviet Union, and now competing for Russia), thirteenth-place finisher Christian Meidlinger of Austria, and twentieth-place finisher Grzegorz Krejner of Poland. Kelly was the reigning world champion and world record holder, as well. Kelly and two-time (1993 and 1994) world champion Florian Rousseau of France were the favorites.

Russia and Ukraine each made their debut in the men's track time trial. France made its 17th appearance, the only nation to have competed at every appearance of the event.

Competition format

The event was a time trial on the track, with each cyclist competing separately to attempt to achieve the fastest time. Each cyclist raced one kilometre from a standing start.

Records

The following were the world and Olympic records prior to the competition.

Erin Hartwell broke the Olympic record with a time of 1:02.940. Florian Rousseau later bettered that, finishing in 1:02.712.

Schedule

All times are Eastern Daylight Time (UTC-4)

Results

Hartwell's Olympic-record race gave him the lead until the last two riders, favorites Rousseau and Kelly (guaranteeing Hartwell a rare second medal to add to his 1992 bronze). Rousseau outdid Hartwell's time, dropping the Olympic record further. Kelly, however, had his foot slip from his toe clip shortly after starting and did not finish.

References

External links
Official Olympic Report

M
Cycling at the Summer Olympics – Men's track time trial
Track cycling at the 1996 Summer Olympics
Men's events at the 1996 Summer Olympics